A room-temperature superconductor is a material that is capable of exhibiting superconductivity at operating temperatures above , that is, temperatures that can be reached and easily maintained in an everyday environment. , the material with the highest claimed superconducting temperature is an extremely pressurized carbonaceous sulfur hydride with a critical transition temperature of +15 °C at 267 GPa. On 22 September 2022, the original article reporting superconductivity in the carbonaceous sulfur hydride material was retracted by Nature journal editorial board due to a non standard, user-defined data analysis, calling into question the scientific validity of the claim.

Although researchers once doubted whether room-temperature superconductivity was actually achievable, superconductivity has repeatedly been discovered at temperatures that were previously unexpected or held to be impossible.

Claims of "near-room temperature" transient effects date from the early 1950s. Finding a room temperature superconductor "would have enormous technological importance and, for example, help to solve the world's energy problems, provide for faster computers, allow for novel memory-storage devices, and enable ultra-sensitive sensors, among many other possibilities."

Reports
Since the discovery of high-temperature superconductors, several materials have been reported to be room-temperature superconductors, although most of these reports have not been confirmed.

In 2000, while extracting electrons from diamond during ion implantation work, Johan Prins claimed to have observed a phenomenon that he explained as room-temperature superconductivity within a phase formed on the surface of oxygen-doped type IIa diamonds in a  vacuum.

In 2003, a group of researchers published results on high-temperature superconductivity in palladium hydride (PdHx: x>1) and an explanation in 2004. In 2007, the same group published results suggesting a superconducting transition temperature of 260 K. The superconducting critical temperature increases as the density of hydrogen inside the palladium lattice increases. This work has not been corroborated by other groups.

In 2012, an Advanced Materials article claimed superconducting behavior of graphite powder after treatment with pure water at temperatures as high as 300 K and above. So far, the authors have not been able to demonstrate the occurrence of a clear Meissner phase and the vanishing of the material's resistance.

In 2014, an article published in Nature suggested that some materials, notably YBCO (yttrium barium copper oxide), could be made to superconduct at room temperature using infrared laser pulses.

In 2015, an article published in Nature by researchers of the Max Planck Institute suggested that under certain conditions such as extreme pressure  transitioned to a superconductive form  at 150GPa (around 1.5 million times atmospheric pressure) in a diamond anvil cell.

In 2018, Dev Kumar Thapa and Anshu Pandey from the Solid State and Structural Chemistry Unit of the Indian Institute of Science in Bangalore claimed the observation of superconductivity at ambient pressure and room temperature in films and pellets of a nanostructured material that is composed of silver particles embedded in a gold matrix. Due to similar noise patterns of supposedly independent plots and the publication's lack of peer review, the results have been called into question. Although the researchers validated their findings in a later paper in 2019, this claim is yet to be verified and confirmed.

In October 2020, room-temperature superconductivity at 288 K (at 15 °C) was reported in a carbonaceous sulfur hydride at very high pressure (267 GPa) triggered into crystallisation via green laser. The paper has been retracted in 2022 as doubts were raised concerning the statistical methods used by the authors to derive the result.

In March 2021, an announcement reported room-temperature superconductivity in a layered yttrium-palladium-hydron material at 262 K and a pressure of 187 GPa.
Palladium may act as a hydrogen migration catalyst in the material.

In March 2023, superconductivity at a temperature of 294 K, and a pressure of 1 GPa, was reported in a nitrogen-doped lutetium hydride material. The claim has been met with some skepticism as it was made by the same team that made similar claims retracted by Nature in 2022.

Theories
Theoretical work by British physicist Neil Ashcroft predicted that solid metallic hydrogen at extremely high pressure (~500 GPa) should become superconducting at approximately room-temperature because of its extremely high speed of sound and expected strong coupling between the conduction electrons and the lattice vibrations (phonons). This prediction is yet to be experimentally verified, as the pressure to achieve metallic hydrogen is not known but may be on the order of 500 GPa.

A team at Harvard University has claimed to make metallic hydrogen and reports a pressure of 495 GPa. Though the exact critical temperature has not yet been determined, weak signs of a possible Meissner effect and changes in magnetic susceptibility at 250 K may have appeared in early magnetometer tests on the original now-lost sample and is being analyzed by the French team working with doughnut shapes rather than planar at the diamond culet tips.

In 1964, William A. Little proposed the possibility of high temperature superconductivity in organic polymers. This proposal is based on the exciton-mediated electron pairing, as opposed to phonon-mediated pairing in BCS theory.

In 2004, Ashcroft returned to his idea and suggested that hydrogen-rich compounds can become metallic and superconducting at lower pressures than hydrogen. More specifically, he proposed a novel way to pre-compress hydrogen chemically by examining IVa hydrides.

It is also possible that if the bipolaron explanation is correct, a normally semiconducting material can transition under some conditions into a superconductor if a critical level of alternating spin coupling in a single plane within the lattice is exceeded; this may have been documented in very early experiments from 1986. The best analogy here would be anisotropic magnetoresistance, but in this case the outcome is a drop to zero rather than a decrease within a very narrow temperature range for the compounds tested similar to "re-entrant superconductivity".

In 2018, support was found for electrons having anomalous 3/2 spin states in YPtBi. Though YPtBi is a relatively low temperature superconductor, this does suggest another approach to creating superconductors.

It was also discovered that many superconductors, including the cuprates and iron pnictides, have two or more competing mechanisms fighting for dominance (Charge density wave) and excitonic states so, as with organic light emitting diodes and other quantum systems, adding the right spin catalyst may by itself increase Tc. A possible candidate would be iridium or gold placed in some of the adjacent molecules or as a thin surface layer so the correct mechanism then propagates throughout the entire lattice similar to a phase transition. As yet, this is speculative; some efforts have been made, notably adding lead to BSCCO, which is well known to help promote high Tc phases by chemistry alone. However, relativistic effects similar to those found in lead-acid batteries might be responsible suggesting that a similar mechanism in mercury- or thallium-based cuprates may be possible using a related metal such as tin.

Any such catalyst would need to be nonreactive chemically but have properties that affect one mechanism but not the others, and also not interfere with subsequent annealing and oxygenation steps nor change the lattice resonances excessively. A possible workaround for the issues discussed would be to use strong electrostatic fields to hold the molecules in place during one of the steps until the lattice is formed.

See also

References

Superconductors
Hypothetical technology
High pressure science